The Catatumbo River is a river rising in northern Colombia, flowing into Lake Maracaibo in Venezuela. It forms a part of the international boundary between the two countries. The river's name means "House of Thunder" in the language of the Bari people.

The river flows through the Catatumbo moist forests ecoregion.
It then flows through the Maracaibo dry forests ecoregion before emptying into Lake Maracaibo. Prior to emptying into Maracaibo, the Catatumbo River also merges with the Zulia River. 

Together with the nearby Escalante River, Catatumbo is a producing area for cocoa beans of the Criollo cultivar.

Catatumbo lightning

The "Relámpago del Catatumbo" or  "Faros del Catatumbo" (Catatumbo lightning) is a phenomenon that occurs over the marshlands at the Lake Maracaibo mouth of the river, where lightning storms occur for about 10 hours a night, 140 to 160 nights a year, for a total of about 1.2 million lightning discharges per year.

Tributaries
The Catatumbo River is fed by the:
 Zulia River
 Pamplonita River (tributary of Táchira)
 Táchira River (tributary of Pamplonita)

References

Rivers of Colombia
Rivers of Venezuela
Maracaibo basin
Lake Maracaibo
International rivers of South America
Colombia–Venezuela border